Acheilognathus coreanus is a species of freshwater ray-finned fish in the genus Acheilognathus.  It is found in Korea and Japan.

References

Acheilognathus
Fish described in 1892